Edgton is a small village and civil parish in Shropshire, England. It is also an ecclesiastical parish and a chapelry. It lies in a rather remote and very rural area, south of the River Onny. The nearest market towns are Bishop's Castle, Craven Arms, Clun and Church Stretton, while the larger village of Lydbury North lies a few miles to the west. It is located 4 miles west of Craven Arms and is positioned on the former stagecoach route from London to Bishop's Castle.

The village
The village of Edgton contains 3 farms and approximately 20 dwellings. It has very few services as the school (built in 1872), the shop and the village public house were all closed down. The school is currently used as a pottery. The village is fairly compact as it is centred on the 3 farms and the church.

Edgton is home to St Michael’s church which was established in the early 13th century. It was rebuilt in 1985-6 and is now a grade II listed building. Before the church was renovated it had fallen into a state of disrepair. Reverend Jones spent £250 of his own money on the repairs and £50 was contributed from the Ecclesiastical Commission. It is a small and intimate church, containing traditional carved box pews and a recently renovated chamber organ.

Instead of a parish council it has a parish meeting; this is due to the very small population of the parish.

Edgton is believed to mean a "settlement on a hill with an edge or brow".

History
Edgton was part of Clun registration district, Clun and Bishops Castle registration district, Lydbury registration sub-district and the Purslow hundred. Edgton used to belong to the ancient monastery of Wenlock Priory. The Reverend Humphrey Sandford bought Edgton in 1812 for £235, so this is when it became a state parish. At the edge of the village there is the Anglo-Saxon church, which in the past allowed travellers to rest at night without disturbing the residents. There is a road which runs nearby the village at Edgton Cross, which has a 19th-century milestone showing that London is 154 miles away and that Bishop’s Castle is 5 miles away. There are many milestones along this road, which suggests that it was an important access route in the past.

Conservation Area
On 16 December 1993, the central part of Edgton was designated a conservation area. Edgton is located within the Shropshire Hills Area of Outstanding Natural Beauty. The area is made up of a large amount of woodland and arable and pasture land. The natural features of the village such as the mature trees, hedges, stone walls and historic boundaries are very important and need to be preserved.

The following buildings and landmarks are regarded as monuments in the Edgton Conservation Area:
The Church of St Michael
The Sundial 2m south west of Church of St Michael
The pedestal tomb 6m south west of Church of St Michael
Manor Farmhouse
Church Farmhouse (former malt house)
The Barn 5m south east of church Farmhouse
The Cowhouse 10m south west of Church Farmhouse
The House on the Green (a 1 storey cottage)
Edgton Farmhouse
Villa Farmhouse
Lower House Farmhouse and attached cowhouse

Almost all of these places are Grade II listed to help to protect them.

Occupational structure

This pie chart shows the occupational structure of Edgton in 1831. It clearly shows that over half of the population at this time worked as agricultural labourers. 24% of the population worked in retail and handicrafts. 15% of the population worked as farmers and the other 7% worked in labour. There were no Professionals or Capitalists in the parish at this time.

Demographics

This graph shows that in 1801, Edgton had a population of 188. This gradually increased each year until 1831, when the population reached its highest with 232 people. The population then begins to decrease, however, there is an increase in people from 1851 to 1881 from 191 people to 223 people. There is a large decrease in the population between 1891 and 1901. The population drops from 185 to 134, which is a loss of 51 people. From 1911, the population of Edgton continues to decrease until there are only 86 people in 1961. Overall, the population has decreased significantly from 1801 to 1961. This indicates that many people wanted to move away from the rural village.

See also
Listed buildings in Edgton

References

External links

Civil parishes in Shropshire
Villages in Shropshire